Éric Pauget (born 18 August 1970) is a French businessman and politician who has represented the 7th constituency of the Alpes-Maritimes department in the National Assembly since 2017. He is a member of The Republicans (LR).

Political career
Pauget held a seat in the Departmental Council of Alpes-Maritimes from 2001 until his resignation in 2017, first for the canton of Antibes-Biot until 2015, then for the canton of Antibes-3. He held one of the departmental council's vice presidencies from 2015 until 2017 under the presidency of Éric Ciotti.

Since 1995, he has been a municipal councillor of Antibes. He served as a deputy mayor from 2001 to 2017; he was first deputy mayor from 2012.

In Parliament, Pauget serves on the Committee on Economic Affairs. In addition to his committee assignments, he is part of the French-Israeli Parliamentary Friendship Group.

In 2018, Pauget joined the leadership of Soyons Libres as a vice president (while remaining a member of The Republicans), a minor party of which he has been a member since 2017 and where he is in charge of relations with the National Assembly.

Political positions
In 2021, Pauget tabled a bill to ban bullfighting in France. A few months later, he sponsored a bill to have prison inmates pay part of the cost of their incarceration.

See also
 2017 French legislative election

References

1970 births
Living people
People from Antibes
Politicians from Provence-Alpes-Côte d'Azur
Rally for the Republic politicians
Union for a Popular Movement politicians
The Republicans (France) politicians
Deputies of the 15th National Assembly of the French Fifth Republic
Deputies of the 16th National Assembly of the French Fifth Republic
French city councillors
Departmental councillors (France)